Meligethes is a genus of pollen beetles in the family Nitidulidae. There are more than 80 described species in Meligethes.

Species
These 81 species belong to the genus Meligethes:

 Meligethes amei
 Meligethes atramentarius Förster, 1849
 Meligethes atratus (Olivier, 1790)
 Meligethes aurantirugosus
 Meligethes aurifer Audisio, Sabatelli & Jelinek, 2015
 Meligethes auripilis
 Meligethes auropilosus Liu, Yang, Huang, Jelinek & Audisio, 2016
 Meligethes aurorugosus
 Meligethes bidens Brisout de Barneville, 1863
 Meligethes bidentatus Brisout de Barneville, 1863
 Meligethes binotatus Grouvelle, 1894
 Meligethes brunnicornis Sturm, 1845
 Meligethes buyssoni Brisout de Barneville, 1882
 Meligethes cardaminicola Audisio & Cline, 2015
 Meligethes chinensis
 Meligethes cinereoargenteus Audisio, Sabatelli & Jelinek, 2015
 Meligethes coeruleivirens Förster, 1849
 Meligethes corvinus Erichson, 1845
 Meligethes cyaneus Easton
 Meligethes denticulatus (Heer, 1841)
 Meligethes detractus Förster, 1891
 Meligethes difficilis (Heer, 1841)
 Meligethes distinctus Sturm, 1845
 Meligethes egenus Erichson, 1845
 Meligethes elytralis Audisio, Sabatelli & Jelinek, 2015
 Meligethes exilis Sturm, 1845
 Meligethes ferrugineus
 Meligethes ferruginoides Audisio, Sabatelli & Jelinek, 2015
 Meligethes flavicollis Reitter, 1873
 Meligethes flavimanus Stephens, 1830
 Meligethes gagathinus Erichson, 1845
 Meligethes haemorrhoidalis Förster, 1849
 Meligethes hoffmanni Reitter, 1871
 Meligethes incanus Sturm, 1845
 Meligethes isoplexidis Wollaston, 1854
 Meligethes kunzei Erichson, 1845
 Meligethes lloydi Easton, 1968
 Meligethes lugubris Sturm, 1845
 Meligethes luteomaculatus Liu, Huang, Cline & Audisio, 2018
 Meligethes macrofemoratus Liu, Yang, Huang, Jelinek & Audisio, 2016
 Meligethes maurus Sturm, 1845
 Meligethes melanocephalus
 Meligethes morosus Erichson, 1845
 Meligethes nanus Erichson, 1845
 Meligethes nepalensis
 Meligethes norvegicus Easton, 1959
 Meligethes ochropus Sturm, 1845
 Meligethes ovatus Sturm, 1845
 Meligethes pallidoelytrorum Chen & Kirejtshuk, 2013
 Meligethes pectinatus Schilsky, 1894
 Meligethes pectoralis Rebmann, 1956
 Meligethes pedicularius (Gyllenhal, 1808)
 Meligethes persicus Faldermann, 1835
 Meligethes planiusculus (Heer, 1841)
 Meligethes politus Motschulsky, 1863
 Meligethes praetermissus Easton
 Meligethes pseudopectoralis Audisio, Sabatelli & Jelinek, 2015
 Meligethes sadanarii Hisamatsu, 2010
 Meligethes salvan Audisio, De Biase & Antonini, 2003
 Meligethes scrobescens Chen, Lin, Huang & Yang, 2015
 Meligethes semenovi Kirejtshuk, 1979
 Meligethes serripes (Gyllenhal, 1827)
 Meligethes shimoyamai Hisamatsu, 1964
 Meligethes shirozui Hisamatsu, 1965
 Meligethes shrozuii Hisamatsu, 1965
 Meligethes solidus (Kugelann, 1794)
 Meligethes subrugosus (Gyllenhal, 1808)
 Meligethes substrigosus Erichson, 1845
 Meligethes sulcatus Brisout de Barneville, 1863
 Meligethes symphyti (Heer, 1841)
 Meligethes torquatus Jelinek, 1997
 Meligethes transmissus Kirejtshuk, 1988
 Meligethes trapezithorax Liu, Huang, Cline & Audisio, 2018
 Meligethes tricuspidatus Liu, Huang, Cline & Audisio, 2018
 Meligethes tristis Sturm, 1845
 Meligethes umbrosus Sturm, 1845
 Meligethes varicollis Wollaston, 1854
 Meligethes violaceus Reitter, 1873
 Meligethes vulpes
 Meligethes wagneri Rebmann, 1956
 Meligethes zakharenkoi Kirejtshuk, 2005

References

Further reading

External links

 

Nitidulidae
Articles created by Qbugbot